Lipocosma teutonialis is a moth in the family Crambidae. It is found in Brazil.

References

Glaphyriinae
Moths described in 1965